Michael Pinckney (born May 28, 1998) is an American football linebacker. He played college football for the Miami Hurricanes from 2016 to 2019. He signed with the New England Patriots as an undrafted free agent in 2020.

College career
Pinckney was a three-star recruit coming out of Raines High School in Jacksonville, Florida. He committed to Miami on January 11, 2016. Pinckney was one of the three freshman linebackers to start in 2016. He started in all 13 games of the season. He finished the season with 61 total tackles (7.5 for loss), 2.5 sacks and an interception. He was named a freshman all-American.

College statistics

Professional career

New England Patriots
After going undrafted, Pinckney was signed to the New England Patriots' practice squad on October 2, 2020. He was suspended by the NFL for six games on November 27, 2020. He was reinstated from suspension on January 4, 2021, and signed a reserve/future contract with the Patriots two days later. He was waived after the season on March 23, 2021.

Chicago Bears
On May 13, 2021, Pinckney signed with the Chicago Bears, but was waived three days later.

Saskatchewan Roughriders
Pinckney signed with the Saskatchewan Roughriders of the CFL on July 16, 2021, and the team subsequently placed him on the suspended list. He was activated on July 20.

References

External links
Miami Hurricanes bio

1998 births
Living people
Players of American football from Jacksonville, Florida
Players of American football from Miami
William M. Raines High School alumni
American football linebackers
Miami Hurricanes football players
New England Patriots players
Chicago Bears players
Saskatchewan Roughriders players
Players of Canadian football from Miami